Jean Louis d'Erlach (1595–1650) was a Swiss general.

1595 births
1650 deaths
Swiss generals
Swiss nobility
People from the Old Swiss Confederacy